Alfian Habibi (born April 16, 1985) is an Indonesian footballer who currently plays for Persiba Balikpapan in the Indonesia Super League.

References

External links

1985 births
Association football defenders
Living people
Indonesian footballers
Liga 1 (Indonesia) players
Gresik United players
Indonesian Premier Division players
PSMS Medan players
Sportspeople from South Sulawesi